X-linked myotubular myopathy (MTM) is a form of centronuclear myopathy (CNM) associated with mutations in the myotubularin 1 gene. It is found almost always in male infants. It is one of the severest congenital muscle diseases and is characterized by marked muscle weakness, hypotonia and feeding and breathing difficulties.

Genetics

This condition is caused by mutations in the myotubularin (MTM1) gene which is located on the long arm of the X chromosome (Xq28). Thus, almost all cases of X-linked MTM occurs in males. Females can be "carriers" for an X-linked genetic abnormality, but usually they will not be clinically affected themselves. Two exceptions for a female with a X-linked recessive abnormality to have clinical symptoms: one is a manifesting carrier and the other is X-inactivation. A manifesting carrier usually has no noticeable problems at birth; symptoms show up later in life. In X-inactivation, the female (who would otherwise be a carrier, without any symptoms), actually presents with full-blown X-linked MTM. Thus, she congenitally presents (is born with) MTM.

Thus, although MTM1 mutations most commonly cause problems in boys, these mutations can also cause clinical myopathy in girls, for the reasons noted above. Girls with myopathy and a muscle biopsy showing a centronuclear pattern should be tested for MTM1 mutations.

Abbreviations XL-MTM, XLMTM or X-MTM are sometimes used to emphasize that the mutation occurs on the X chromosome.

Research

Astellas Gene Therapies (earlier called Audentes Therapeutics) is developing an experimental gene therapy to treat the condition. A clinical trial was halted in 2020 after two boys participating in the trial died of liver inflammation and sepsis.

References

External links 
 GeneReview/NCBI/NIH/UW entry on X-Linked Myotubular Myopathy

Myoneural junction and neuromuscular diseases
Rare diseases